Scooter Page (born Scott Caudill on December 3, 1976), is an American actor, musician and songwriter from San Pedro, California.

Early life
Scooter Page was born and raised in San Pedro, California. Page attended San Pedro High School. Since he was young, Scooter has enjoyed writing songs and stories. At age 15, he made his acting debut as one of the Newsies Dancers in Disney's Newsies (1992). This led to roles in 3 Ninjas (1992) as well as 3 Ninjas Kick Back (1994) and a steady career in film and television.

Acting career
Page, whose film and TV work is credited by his birth name, Scott Caudill has appeared in various films and television shows since his first appearance in Disney's Newsies (1992). Later that year, he was cast as Daren in 3 Ninjas and its 1994 sequel, 3 Ninjas Kick Back. In 2002, he appeared as Blaine in HBO's Wishcraft, in which he co-starred with Meatloaf, who became a close on-set friend and adviser. Page is also known for his roles in Peaceful Warrior (2006) and National Lampoon's Endless Bummer (2009).

In addition to his film career, Page has appeared in guest roles on numerous television shows including CSI: Crime Scene Investigation ("Sounds of Silence" – 2001), The Mentalist ("Rose-Colored Glasses" – 2010), Bones ("The Devil in the Detail" – 2010), Saving Grace ("You Think I'm Gonna Eat My Gun?" – 2010), and many more. In 2004, he landed a recurring role on CBS's The Young and the Restless (Episode #1.7815, #1.7816 – 2004) as "D." Then, in 2007, he was cast as Dwayne/Duane, the biker in TeenNick’s Beyond the Break ("Vin, Lose, or Draw" – 2006, "Fiji Open" – 2007).

Dancing career
In 1999, Page was part of the dance team that performed “Wild, Wild West” with Will Smith and Dru Hill at the MTV Movie Awards. Page performed again with Smith at KIIS FM's 1999 Wango Tango concert held at Dodger Stadium. He was also featured in several music videos, including Carlos Santana's "Maria Maria" (1999), which featured Wyclef Jean, Billy Crawford's "Mary Lopez" (1999), and Nobody's Angel’s "Wanna Dance" (1999).

Music career
In 1999, Page released his first album, Point In Time, under the pseudonym Jesic, a contraction of Jesus and music. Shortly after the release of his first album, Page went on to release his second studio EP, 4 Now 6 Later, which was independently released in 2002.  Here2Hear, released in 2011, was the last album that Page released using this pseudonym. The albums released during this time were a mix of R&B and pop styles with rock influence consisting of uplifting lyrics inspired by Page's Christian-based world view.

In 2014, Page dropped the Jesic pseudonym and opted to go by Scooter Page. Along with the change in name, the sound of his music shifted towards a pop/rock sound with more personal lyrics inspired by life experiences. The first album created using his new name was Evolution To Better Days and was released in 2014. It was recorded at Hemispheres Recording Studio in Nashville, Tennessee, and featured Page and James Lugo as Co-Producers. Lugo is best known for his engineering work with artists such as The Smashing Pumpkins, Snoop Dogg, Bruce Springsteen, and Rod Stewart. The album's first single, "I Miss Home (Not)," was released under the TMG/LRT record label distributed by Universal Music Group and was featured on Vevo Video.

Page's latest album, 4224, was released in 2019. In a feature article published by Buzz Music, 4224 is described as featuring “heavy instrumentals filled with enough emotion while still remaining gritty, alternative rock. With elements of classic rock mixed with contemporary rhythms and a powerful sound, 4224 is an intense album.”

The album includes singles "If You Were Me" and "King of the Night" and features Page, Ricko Baird, and James Lugo in the writer credits. The singles help to further express Page's artistry, executing dynamic shifts in both sound and melody.

In support of Page's latest album, he has performed in clubs around the LA area with such acts as The Red Jumpsuit Apparatus, Drake Bell, and Alien Ant Farm.

Style and influence
Page's music crosses the boundaries of many different genres but overall is considered alternative pop/rock soul. He is influenced by a wide range of musical acts including Prince, Jack White, Fall Out Boy, Marvin Gaye, Eminem, Aerosmith, and Snoop Dogg. These inspirations are made clear by the energy he brings to his live performances which have been cited as contagious and irreplaceable- an experience in itself.

In order to gain songwriting inspiration, Page pulls from the genres of music he listened to while growing up including R&B, hip hop, rock and dance.

Other work
Page formed his production company, Marbleized Corporation, in 2016 in order to manage his writing, acting, recordings, and production projects.

In the summer of 2016, Page began work on his first novel, The Longshore Entertainer, a fictional story based on the juxtaposition of his own experiences as a dock worker and an entertainer.

Filmography

Film

Television

Discography

Albums

Singles

References

External links

Scooter Page Official Site 

American male actors
American alternative rock musicians
Songwriters from California
1976 births
Living people